Pitch drop-back is the phenomena by which an aircraft which is perturbed in flight path angle from its trim position by a step input exhibits an output which is indicative of a second order system.

A pilot who actuates an elevator input may find that the aircraft then "droops" or "drops back" to a position further toward the start position.  The phenomenon is particularly marked in tilt-rotor aircraft. Pitch drop-back may be controlled using a Stability Augmentation System or Stability Control and Augmentation System.

References

Aerospace engineering